Yaroslav Bohdanovych Khoma (born 17 February 1974) is a Ukrainian former footballer who played as a midfielder and made one appearance for the Ukraine national team.

Career
Khoma made his only international appearance for Ukraine on 20 February 2001 in a friendly match against Georgia, which finished as a 0–0 draw.

Career statistics

International

References

External links
 
 
 
 

1974 births
Living people
Ukrainian National Forestry University alumni
Ukrainian footballers
Ukraine international footballers
Association football midfielders
FC Sambir players
FC Volyn Lutsk players
FC Kovel-Volyn Kovel players
FC Podillya Khmelnytskyi players
FC Karpaty Lviv players
FC Karpaty-2 Lviv players
FC Shakhtar Donetsk players
FC Shakhtar-2 Donetsk players
FC Karpaty-3 Lviv players
FC Metalurh Zaporizhzhia players
FC Kryvbas Kryvyi Rih players
Ukrainian Premier League players
Ukrainian First League players
Ukrainian Second League players
Ukrainian Amateur Football Championship players
Sportspeople from Lviv Oblast